Charles B. Dew (born 1937) is an American author and historian, specializing in the history of the Southern United States and the American Civil War and the Reconstruction era. He has published three books, one of which was a New York Times Notable Book of the Year. He is the Ephraim Williams Professor of American History at Williams College.

Biography
Dew grew up in a white family in St. Petersburg, Florida, which he called "a Jim Crow town to the core". His family had an African-American help, who ate and drank from her own plate and cup, and who used a "grossly unequal" bathroom for her only. In an essay he wrote on the occasion of the publication of The Making of a Racist in 2016, he commented that he hadn't crossed the Mason–Dixon line until he went to college in 1954, and that his experiences at Williams College—where he studied history (which "blew [his] assumptions about Confederate glory out of the water") and had black classmates—were formative for his developing a critique of what he termed "collective white blindness". He graduated in 1958 and received his Ph.D. in history from Johns Hopkins University in 1964.

Dew is a descendant of Thomas Roderick Dew (1802–1846), who was a "passionate apologist" for slavery, and he writes about his family heritage in The Making of a Racist. The book was the result of a self-examination which he said was prompted by his coming across a price list for slaves from 1860: "I thought, how could my white southern ancestors have been complicit in this?", to which the only answers are greed and the belief in white superiority, which Southern boys received "by osmosis".

Dew was married to writer Robb Forman Dew until her death in 2020.

Education
High school diploma- Woodberry Forest School, Class of 1954
Undergraduate degree- Williams College, Class of 1958
PhD- Johns Hopkins University, Class of 1964

Writings

 
Critic Leonard Pitts was less than impressed with the answers that Dew provided for why he and his family remained racist for a long time, though he found his account of falling away from the racism of his family and region "compelling".
 

 Notable Book of the Year for 1994 by The New York Times Book Review; published as paperback in 1995.

References

External links

1937 births
Living people
Williams College faculty
Williams College alumni
Historians of the American Civil War
Writers from St. Petersburg, Florida
Woodberry Forest School alumni
20th-century American historians
21st-century American historians
20th-century American male writers
21st-century American male writers
American male non-fiction writers
Historians from Florida
Johns Hopkins University alumni
Non-fiction books about American slavery